Abbeville is a city in Wilcox County, Georgia, United States. Per the 2020 census, the population was 2,685. The city is the county seat of Wilcox County.

History 
Abbeville was founded in 1857 as seat of the newly formed Wilcox County. The town was incorporated in 1883. According to one tradition, the city was named after Abbie McNally, the wife of the original owner of the site, while another tradition states the name is a transfer from Abbeville, South Carolina. The current Wilcox County Courthouse was built in 1903 and it is listed on the National Register of Historic Places.

Abbeville was home to the Georgia Normal College and Business Institute.

In 1910 Abbeville had a population of 1,201. In 1950 it had a population of 890.

Geography

Climate

Demographics

2020 census

Note: the US Census treats Hispanic/Latino as an ethnic category. This table excludes Latinos from the racial categories and assigns them to a separate category. Hispanics/Latinos can be of any race.

2000 Census
As of the census of 2000, there were 2,298 people, 373 households, and 255 families residing in the city. The racial makeup of the city was 41.04% White, 58.40% African American, 0.17% from other races, and 0.39% from two or more races. Hispanic or Latino of any race were 0.39% of the population.

There were 373 households, out of which 33.5% had children under the age of 18 living with them, 44.2% were married couples living together, 21.2% had a female householder with no husband present, and 31.4% were non-families. 28.7% of all households were made up of individuals, and 16.6% had someone living alone who was 65 years of age or older. The average household size was 2.52 and the average family size was 3.06.

In the city, the population was spread out, with 12.1% under the age of 18, 12.1% from 18 to 24, 47.0% from 25 to 44, 19.8% from 45 to 64, and 9.1% who were 65 years of age or older. The median age was 36 years. For every 100 females, there were 302.5 males. For every 100 females age 18 and over, there were 369.8 males.

The median income for a household in the city was $21,193, and the median income for a family was $23,750. Males had a median income of $27,183 versus $19,107 for females. The per capita income for the city was $10,029. About 28.5% of families and 31.7% of the population were below the poverty line, including 46.7% of those under age 18 and 22.0% of those age 65 or over.

In 2010 Abbeville had a population of 2,908. The racial and ethnic composition was 37.4% non-Hispanic white, 55.8% black or African American, 0.1% Native American, 0.5% Asian, 0.2% non-Hispanic reporting some other race, 1.7% reporting two or more races, 5.3% Hispanic with 0.5% of the population being Hispanic who reported their race as black or African American.

Education 

The Wilcox County School District holds pre-school to grade twelve, and consists of an elementary school, a middle school, and a high school. The district has 90 full-time teachers and over 1,439 students.

The schools, located in Rochelle, are:
Wilcox County Elementary School
Wilcox County Middle School
Wilcox County High School

Trivia
Abbeville is famous for its large population of wild hogs. The Ocmulgee Wild Hog Festival is held annually in May with food, arts and crafts, live music, and various contests.

References

Cities in Georgia (U.S. state)
Cities in Wilcox County, Georgia
County seats in Georgia (U.S. state)